Violin is a novel by American horror writer Anne Rice, released on 15 October 1997.  It moves away from her previous stories about vampires and witches to tell a ghost story.

Plot summary

The book is set in numerous places, including Vienna, New Orleans and Rio de Janeiro.  The novel tells the story of three people: a middle-aged woman yearning to become a musician, a ghostly violinist, and the ghost of Beethoven.

The story begins with Triana, who apparently becomes insane due to the death of her second husband, Karl, who had AIDS. Her first husband was Lev, with whom Triana had a daughter. Stefan, the ghost, appears the day Karl dies and plays his Stradivarius (s long Strad) (apparently also a ghost). Triana secludes herself in her house for several days without informing anyone of Karl's death.

The book tells the story of both Triana and Stefan. Stefan takes Triana in a travel through time, visiting scenes from his life and his afterlife in an attempt to reclaim his violin, which had been taken by Triana. Stefan had many mentors including Beethoven and Paganini, but it is Beethoven whom Stefan cherished the most. After Stefan's story is "told" Triana returns to her rightful time but not to New Orleans where the story began but to Vienna, and now seemingly possessing a talent to improvise in the violin.

The ghost of this great musician is shown about two times in the novel, the first one in a scene where Stefan's house in Vienna is burning, and the second one almost at the end where Beethoven appears in modern Vienna in the hotel room where Triana was staying.

With Triana still in possession of the strad, Stefan continues his attempts to reclaim the violin but to no avail, until finally, after achieving success with her improvisations it is in Brazil that Triana returns the violin to his rightful owner and Stefan finally crosses over.

1997 American novels
Novels by Anne Rice
American horror novels
Alfred A. Knopf books
Novels about music